Mark Krasniqi (9 October 1920 – 28 August 2015) was an Kosovar Albanian ethnographist, publicist, writer and translator who did most of his work while residing in Yugoslavia.

Biography  
He was born on 19 October 1920 in near Peć, in the Kingdom of Serbs, Croats and Slovenes. He finished elementary school in Peć in the Serbian language and due to his Catholic background attended the Catholic high school in Prizren, being one of few Albanians among mostly Croatians and Slovenes, finishing in 1941. After high school, he studied literature at the University of Padova, Italy and after World War II he studied geography and ethnography at the University of Belgrade. Krasniqi was a contributor to the Rilindja newspaper since 1945 in Prizren. After writing an article related to Marije Shllaku, he was accused of overpassing the nationalistic boundaries and his scholarship got cancelled. Despite that, he graduated in 1950.

After his graduation, until the end of 1961, he worked in the Ethnographical Institute of the Serbian Academy of Sciences and Arts, being one of few ethnic Albanians to receive a membership in that Academy. Since 1961 he lectured at the University of Pristina (now Universiteti i Prishtinës); he was also a member of Academy of Sciences and Arts of Kosovo.  Krasniqi earned his PhD in the University of Ljubljana in 1960. He published various studies and scientific books on ethnography and geography as well as textbooks.
He was most widely known as a writer, especially for his poetry for children.

Krasniqi was a member of the Assembly of Kosovo during the legislatures of 2001-2004, 2004-2007, and 2007-2010 representing Albanian Christian Democratic Party of Kosovo, part of respectively LDK, LDK, and LDD parliamentary groups. He has also served as President of Academy of Sciences and Arts of Kosovo, Dean at the Faculty of Law and Economics, President of Albanian Christian Democratic Party (PSHDK), and First Head of the Association of Writers of Kosovo. Beside Albanian and Serbo-Croatian he was fluent in Italian.

Publications

Scientific studies
Contemporary socio-geographical changes in Kosovo and Dukagjin, 1963, in Serbo-Croatian, publisher: Rilindja, Prishtina, OCLC 631576938
Trails and tracking, Ethnographic studies, 1982, publisher: Shtëpia Botuese "8 Nëntori", Tirana, OCLC 13845605
Trough of Barani: Ethnographic monograph, 1985, publisher: Academy of Sciences and Arts of Kosovo, OCLC 23575118
Rugova: Ethnographic monograph (as co-author), 1987, publisher: Akademija Nauka i Umetnosti Kosova, OCLC 249450825
From the source of traditions, Ethnographic studies, 1991, publisher: Zëri, Prishtina, OCLC 500189890
Mythological aspects, beliefs and superstitions, 1997, publisher: Gazeta "Rilindja", Prishtina, OCLC 796234833
Our ethnic roots, 2002, publisher: Albanian Christian Democratic Party of Kosovo, Prishtina, OCLC 500191010
Faith in Albanian traditions, 2011, publisher: Academy of Sciences and Arts of Kosovo, 
Hospitality in Albanian traditions, 2005, publisher: Academy of Sciences and Arts of Kosovo, 
Tolerance in Albanian traditions, 2007, publisher: Academy of Sciences and Arts of Kosovo, 
Ethnic aspect of migrations: Albanians through violent deportations, 2012, publisher: Academy of Sciences and Arts of Kosovo, Prishtina,  (Hivzi Islami as co-author)
Sami Frasheri and the pedagogy of National Awakening, 1995, publisher: Academy of Sciences and Arts of Kosovo, Prishtina, OCLC 439580947 (Jashar Rexhepagiq as co-author)
Folkloric Architecture of the Region of Prizren During the 18th and 19th Centuries, 2011, publisher: Academy of Sciences and Arts of Kosovo, Prishtina,  (Shpresë Siqeca; Pajazit Nushi; Hivzi Islami as co-authors)
Woman and the evolution of birth in Kosovo, 2009, publisher: Academy of Sciences and Arts of Kosovo, Prishtina,  (Mimoza Dushi; Hivzi Islami as co-authors)
Collection of works, wrap up of a decade of work 1961-1971, 1972, publisher: Fakulteti Juridik-Ekonomik i Prishtinës, Prishtina, OCLC 500049145 (in Albanian and Serbo-Croatian)
Etno-geographical meaning of Rugova's toponyms, 1982, publisher: Yugoslavian Academy of Arts and Sciences, Zagreb, OCLC 438827593

Textbooks
Economical geography, permanent faculty text, 1985 (4th edition, previous three in Serbian)
Geography of Yugoslavia, high school text, 1975, publisher: "Enti i teksteve dhe mjeteve mesimore i Krahinës Socialiste Autonome të Kosovës", OCLC 255896663
Geography for elementary school, VIII grade, 3rd edition, 1978

Publicistics
Positioning and reactions, publisher: Ars poetica, Prishtina, 1995, OCLC 635691315
Kosovo today: detailed report presented to the Belgian Senate, 1992, Brussels, in German and English, OCLC 500191038
Endeavors for Kosovo, 2002, publisher: Albanian Christian Democratic Party of Kosovo, Prishtina, OCLC 500189873

Poetry
"Grandpa's tales", 1953, publisher: "Mustafa Bakija", Prishtina, OCLC 40093006
"First light", 1956
"Ordered mail", 1959, publisher: Rilindja, Prishtina, OCLC 320079155
"Illiterate rabbit", 1974
"Mountain postman", 1984, publisher: Rilindja, Prishtina, OCLC 500047749 (Drita M Jovanović as co-author)
"Time's echo", 1972, publisher: Shtëpia botuese "Naim Frashëri", Tirana, OCLC 13445098
"Beetle's tower", 1989, publisher: Rilindja, Prishtina, OCLC 441007180 
"Snowhite" (adaptation), 1956
"Selected poetry for children", 1998

Translations
Spiders (novel), Ivo Ćipiko, Belgrade, 1909, publisher: "Milladin Popovic", Prishtina, 1947
The Servant Jernej and His Justice, Ivan Cankar, 1907, publisher: Progres, Prishtina, 1949, OCLC: 451225721
The Tale of Tsar Saltan, Alexander Pushkin, 1831
The big year 1941, evidence regarding World War II in Yugoslavia, various, publisher: Directory of Information, Government of Serbia P.R., Belgrade, 1950
Macedonian writers for children, poetry compilation, various, publisher: Rilindja, Prishtina, 1962
"Zambarja e shelqes", poetry compilation from Grigor Vitez, publisher: SGB Rilindja, Prishtina, 1960
The Tale of the Dead Princess and the Seven Knights, Alexander Pushkin, 1833, publisher: "Mustafa Bakija", Prishtina, 1952
General history, schools and pedagogical ideas (partial translation), Leon Zlebnik, publisher: "Milladin Popoviq", Prishtina, 1958
Hedgehog's house, Branko Ćopić, publisher: Nova Makedonija, Shkup, 1964

As co-translator
Read and travel China to Paris, Mayakovsky (co-translator Esad Mekuli), publisher: Directorate of Education for Kosmet, Belgrade, 1948
The Tale of the Golden Cockerel, Alexander Pushkin, 1834 (co-translator Esad Mekuli), publisher: Directorate of Education for Kosmet, Belgrade, 1949
Snowhite (adaptation), Hans Christian Andersen, publisher: "Mustafa Bakija", Prishtina, 1956
First book for the homeland, Zagorčić - Herzog, publisher: "Mustafa Bakija", Prishtina, 1954 (co-translator Adem Bllaca)

Further reading
Children's poetry of Mark Krasniqi: monographic study, Anton Berisha, publisher: "Faik Konica", Prishtina, 2002,

References

Russian–Albanian translators
Serbian–Albanian translators
20th-century translators
University of Belgrade alumni
Academic staff of the University of Pristina
University of Ljubljana alumni
University of Padua alumni
Albanian Roman Catholics
Kosovo Albanians
Kosovan Roman Catholics
Writers from Peja
1920 births
2015 deaths
Christian Democratic Party of Kosovo politicians
Albanologists
20th-century Albanian poets
Yugoslav poets
Yugoslav people of Albanian descent
Kosovan ethnographers
Yugoslav ethnographers
Members of the Academy of Sciences and Arts of Kosovo